Kyriakos Onisiforou (born 10 April 1951 in Nicosia, Cyprus) is a Greek former sprinter who competed in the 1972 Summer Olympics.

References

1951 births
Living people
Cypriot male sprinters
Greek male sprinters
Olympic athletes of Greece
Athletes (track and field) at the 1972 Summer Olympics
Athletes (track and field) at the 1971 Mediterranean Games
Athletes (track and field) at the 1975 Mediterranean Games
Mediterranean Games gold medalists for Greece
Mediterranean Games silver medalists for Greece
Mediterranean Games medalists in athletics
Sportspeople from Nicosia
20th-century Greek people